Lake Fenton Community School District is a public school district in Genesee County in the U.S. state of Michigan and in the Genesee Intermediate School District. The district is a classified as a "Class C"
school district consisting of 27 square miles which takes in portions of the city of Fenton, Fenton Township, parts of Grand Blanc, Linden and Mundy townships.

History
The district originally began as a collection of six one-room schoolhouses that consolidated in two waves. O'Dell Schoolhouse was designated as School District No. 1 and was located at the corner of Baldwin and Torrey roads in Fenton Township on land owned by Lafayette O'Dell and later donated by his descendant William O'Dell. The school was started in 1837, and was the first record school in the county. The first schoolhouse was built in 1845. At annexation, the school was the oldest district still in continuous operation.

The first wave of consolidation was in 1922, and consisted of Severance, Long Lake and Sand Bar schools joined together. In 1953–54, the school district added the O'Dell, South Mundy and Kennedy one-room schools.

Consolidation began in 1922 and, in 1956, the Lake Fenton Community School (essentially West Shore Elementary and Torrey Hill Middle School) was built to replace the one-room schools. The school itself sat on the site of one of the one-room schools, the former Long Lake School. Then, in 1959, the first Lake Fenton High School was built, being added onto the Community School.  In time, West Shore and Torrey Hill moved to a new building in Lahring Road, and the high school occupied the 1956 school building.  Today, Torrey Hill is an intermediate school, the original high school a middle school and a new high school that has been built on Lahring Road in Fenton Township.

High school

Athletics

The Lake Fenton Blue Devils play in the Flint Metro League and compete in many sports including Basketball, Cheer (Competitive & Sideline), Football, Cross Country, Track, and, after adding Gymnastics and Lacrosse in 2015, Fenton offered opportunities for every Michigan High School Athletics Association (MHSAA) tournament sport.

References

External links
lakefentonschools.org - official url
lake-fenton.schoolfusion.us - actual website

School districts in Michigan
Education in Genesee County, Michigan
1956 establishments in Michigan
School districts established in 1956